Marek Solarczyk (born 13 April 1967) is a Polish Roman Catholic prelate, Bishop-elect of Radom.

Formation

A native of Wołomin, in east-central Poland, he studied at the Metropolitan Higher Seminary in Warsaw and received his priestly ordination in 1992 at the St. Florian's Cathedral, being incardinated in the Diocese of Warszawa-Praga. He finished his doctorate in Church History in The Catholic Academy of Warsaw in 1999, and acted as a professor on the subject.

Bishop

After a brief tenure as parish priest of St. Florian's Cathedral (2009-2011) he was named Auxiliary Bishop of Warszawa-Praga by Pope Benedict XVI on 8 October 2011, receiving the titular see of Hólar, Iceland. His consecration took place at St. Florian's Cathedral on 19 November 2011. On 4 January 2021, Pope Francis appointed him to succeed Henryk Tomasik as Bishop of Radom.

References

1967 births
Living people
People from Wołomin
Polish Roman Catholic titular bishops
21st-century Roman Catholic bishops in Poland